Marie "Maja" Hedemark (March 24, 1873 – August 8, 1959) was a Norwegian actress.

Family
Hedemark was the daughter of the teacher Emil Bernhard Olsen (1842–1897) and Severine Mathilde Heidenstrøm. She was born in Kristiania (now Oslo), Norway. She married the actor Hans Ingi Hedemark on December 23, 1905.

Career
Hedemark made her debut at the Fahlstrøm Theater in 1899 under the name Marie Heiden, a name derived from her mother's maiden name. She was associated with that theater until it closed in 1911. She was employed at the Central Theater from 1911 until around 1942.

Hedemark made her film debut in 1926 in Den nye lensmannen. In the 1930s she appeared in seven more films, including Fantegutten (1932), Lalla vinner! (1932), and Bør Børson Jr. (1938), which was her last film role. In the 1930s, Hedemark was also active at the Oslo New Theater.

Filmography

 1926: Den nye lensmannen as Berthe Brødlaus, Jens's wife
 1931: Den store barnedåpen as a woman
 1932: Prinsessen som ingen kunne målbinde as the brothers' mother
 1932: Fantegutten as Marja, a fortuneteller
 1932: Lalla vinner! as Batzeba, a singer at Tivoli
 1937: To levende og en død as a guest at the hostel
 1938: Ungen as a working woman
 1938: Bør Børson Jr. as Ole Elveplassen's wife

References

External links
 
 Marie Hedemark at the Swedish Film Database
 Marie Hedemark at Sceneweb
 Marie Hedemark at Filmfront

1873 births
1959 deaths
19th-century Norwegian actresses
20th-century Norwegian actresses
Actresses from Oslo